The Jules E. Mastbaum Area Vocational/Technical School (commonly referred to as the Jules Mastbaum Area Vocational High School) is a public high school in Kensington, Philadelphia, Pennsylvania, United States. It is a part of the School District of Philadelphia and serves grades 9–12. It was named after Jules Ephraim Mastbaum.

Trivia
In 1982 the basketball team members were short compared to those of other high schools. That year, the tallest player was 6 feet and three inches.

Notable alumni
 James Brown, former NFL player
 Uhuru Hamiter, former NFL player
 Shep Shepherd (1917-2018), jazz musician, drummer, trombone player
 Lee Morgan (1939–1972), jazz musician, trumpet player
 Veronica Hamel, actor

References

Further reading
 Silary, Ted. "In Control Of The Situation Freitag Gains Command Of Pitches, Helps Mastbaum Snap Washington's Streak." (Info page) Philadelphia Daily News. April 28, 1987. Sports p. 68.

External links

 Jules Mastbaum Vocational/Technical School
 Jules Mastbaum Vocational/Technical School (Archive)
 Mastbaum Alumni Association

High schools in Philadelphia
Kensington, Philadelphia